Triethyl orthoacetate is the organic compound with the formula CH3C(OC2H5)3.  It is the ethyl orthoester of acetic acid. It is a colorless oily liquid.

Triethyl orthoacetate is used in organic synthesis for acetylation.

It is also used in the Johnson-Claisen rearrangement.

References

Orthoesters
Reagents for organic chemistry
Ethyl esters